(birthdate unknown, died December 19, 1998)  was an anime producer, audio director, and sound effects director in Japan who has worked with Studio Comet, NAS, and Tsuchida Production.

Works
Ashita Tenki ni Naare (TV) (producer)
Dame Oyaji (TV) (audio director)
Genji Tsūshin Agedama (TV) (sound effects director)
High School! Kimengumi (TV, movie) (producer)
Kuroi Ame ni Utarete (movie) (producer)
The Little Prince (TV) (production desk)
Ojaman ga Yamada-kun (TV) (production desk)
RPG Densetsu e Poi (TV) (sound effects director)
Sasuga Sarutobi (TV) (production chief)

Sources:

References

External links
 Japan Movie Database
 AllCinema Online

Anime directors
Japanese animated film producers
Japanese animated film directors
Japanese television producers
Japanese film directors
Japanese film producers
1998 deaths
Year of birth missing
Japanese voice directors
Japanese animators
Japanese male voice actors